Visionary is the seventeenth studio album by German rock band Eloy, released on 24 November 2009 through Artist Station Records.

Track listing

Reception

Personnel 
 Frank Bornemann – lead and backing vocals, acoustic and electric guitars
 Klaus-Peter Matziol – bass
 Michael Gerlach – keyboards
 Bodo Schopf – drums, percussion
 Hannes Folberth – additional keyboards (2, 3, 4 & 6)

Guest musicians 
 Anke Renner – vocals (2, 4, 5 & 6)
 Tina Lux – vocals (2, 4 & 6)
 Volker Kuinke – renaissance flute (1 & 2)
 Christoph Littmann – keyboards, orchestra sounds (5)
 Stephan Emig – additional percussion (4 & 6)

References 

2009 albums
Eloy (band) albums